Malin Petersen (born January 31, 1981, in Alva, Sweden) is a Swedish equestrian. At the 2012 Summer Olympics she competed in the Individual eventing.

References

Swedish event riders
Living people
Olympic equestrians of Sweden
Swedish female equestrians
Equestrians at the 2012 Summer Olympics
1981 births